White Hot Moon is the second studio album by American shoegaze band, Pity Sex. The album was released through Run for Cover on April 29, 2016.

Track listing

Chart positions

References 

2016 albums
Run for Cover Records albums
Pity Sex albums
Albums produced by Will Yip